Peter Frederick Watson (15 April 1934 – 17 August 2013) was an English professional footballer who played as a centre half.

Career
Born in Stapleford, Watson played for Stapleford Rovers, Nottingham Forest and Southend United. He later worked as a coach at Charlton Athletic and Cambridge United before becoming a decorator.

Personal life
Watson was married with two sons. He had three sisters and four brothers, including England international footballer David.

References

1934 births
2013 deaths
English footballers
Nottingham Forest F.C. players
Southend United F.C. players
English Football League players
Association football defenders
Charlton Athletic F.C. non-playing staff
Cambridge United F.C. non-playing staff
People from Stapleford, Nottinghamshire
Footballers from Nottinghamshire